Poly(A)-specific ribonuclease (PARN), also known as polyadenylate-specific ribonuclease or deadenylating nuclease (DAN), is an enzyme that in humans is encoded by the PARN gene.

Function 

Exonucleolytic degradation of the poly(A) tail is often the first step in the decay of eukaryotic mRNAs.  The amino acid sequence of poly(A)-specific ribonuclease shows homology to the RNase D family of 3'-exonucleases. The protein appears to be localized in both the nucleus and the cytoplasm. It is not stably associated with polysomes or ribosomal subunits. Hereditary mutations in PARN lead to the bone marrow failure disease dyskeratosis congenita which is caused by defective telomerase RNA processing and degradation in patients.

References

Further reading 

 
 
 
 
 
 
 
 
 
 
 
 
 
 
 
 
 

EC 3.1.13